The Green Party (SZ) leadership election of 2015 was held on 24 January 2015. Jana Drápalová became  the first female leader of the Party. She defeated Petr Štěpánek and Tomáš Schejbal.

Candidates
Jana Drápalová
Tomáš Schejbal
Petr Štěpánek

Voting
Voting was held on 24 January 2015. Drápalová and Štěpánek were considered main Candidates. Štěpánek in his nomination Speech. He focused on his political experiences and opposition to Fossil Fuels and Nuclear Energy. Drápalová stated that Greens have to be more united. She also stated that it was a key goal for the Party to return to the Chamber of Deputies. Schejbal stated to he wants the Green Party to be more left wing noting Syriza and Podemos as an inspiration. He stated that Europe is on the Crossroad: "Socialism or Death."

Drápalová received 115 votes  of 198 and was elected. Her main rival Štěpánek had 69 votes while third Candidate Schejbal only 11

References

Green Party (Czech Republic) leadership elections
Green Party leadership election
Green Party (Czech Republic) leadership election
Indirect elections
Green Party (Czech Republic) leadership election